The 2016 Korea Open was a women's  professional tennis tournament played on hard courts. It was the 13th edition of the tournament, and part of the 2016 WTA Tour. It took place in Seoul, South Korea between 19 and 25 September 2016.

Points and prize money

Point distribution

Prize money

* per team

Singles main-draw entrants

Seeds 

 1 Rankings are as of September 12, 2016

Other entrants 

The following players received wildcards into the singles main draw:
  Han Na-lae 
  Jang Su-jeong
  Lee So-ra

The following player received entry as a special exempt:
  Tereza Martincová

The following players received entry from the qualifying draw:
  Eri Hozumi 
  Luksika Kumkhum 
  Katarzyna Piter 
  Arantxa Rus

Withdrawals 
  Kristína Kučová → replaced by  Sara Sorribes Tormo
  Shelby Rogers → replaced by  Jana Čepelová
  Yaroslava Shvedova  → replaced by  Marina Erakovic

Doubles main-draw entrants

Seeds 

1 Rankings are as of September 12, 2016

Other entrants 

The following players received wildcards into the singles main draw:
  Han Sung-hee /  Kim Da-bin
  Hong Seung-yeon /  Kang Seo-kyung

Finals

Singles 

 Lara Arruabarrena defeated  Monica Niculescu, 6–0, 2–6, 6–0

Doubles 

 Kirsten Flipkens /  Johanna Larsson defeated  Akiko Omae /  Peangtarn Plipuech, 6–2, 6–3

References

External links 
 

Korea Open
Korea Open
2010s in Seoul
Korea Open (tennis)
September 2016 sports events in South Korea